Varzard may refer to:
 Varzard-e Olya
 Varzard-e Sofla